Elizabeth Jean Carroll is an American journalist, author, and advice columnist. Her "Ask E. Jean" column appeared in Elle magazine from 1993 through 2019, becoming one of the longest-running advice columns in American publishing.

In her 2019 book, What Do We Need Men For?: A Modest Proposal, Carroll accused Les Moonves and Donald Trump of sexually assaulting her in the mid-1990s. Both Moonves and Trump denied the allegations.  Carroll subsequently sued Trump in New York Supreme Court for defamation and battery.

Early life
Elizabeth Jean Carroll was born in Detroit, Michigan. She also went by "Jeannie". Her father, Thomas F. Carroll, Jr., was an inventor, and her mother, Betty (née McKinney) Carroll, was a retired Allen County, Indiana politician. The oldest of four children, Carroll was raised in Fort Wayne, Indiana with her two sisters and one brother. She attended Indiana University. A Pi Beta Phi and a cheerleader, she was crowned Miss Indiana University in 1963, and in 1964, as a representative of the university, she won the Miss Cheerleader USA title. She appeared on To Tell The Truth in 1965.

Career

Column: Ask E. Jean
Carroll's "Ask E. Jean" column appeared in Elle from 1993 until 2020. Widely read, it was acclaimed for Carroll's opinions on sex, her insistence that women should "never never" structure their lives around men, and her compassion for letter-writers experiencing difficult life situations. When it debuted, Amy Gross, a former editor-in-chief of Elle, compared the column to putting Carroll on a "bucking bronco", describing her responses to readers as "the cheers and whoops and hollers of a fearless woman having a good ol' time." Carroll's writing style had been described as quirky, cheeky, and irreverent often using humor.

Carroll was fired from Elle in February 2020; she wrote on Twitter that she was dismissed "Because Trump ridiculed my reputation, laughed at my looks, & dragged me through the mud." Elle maintained that the decision to fire Carroll was a business decision unrelated to Trump.

Television: Ask E. Jean, Saturday Night Live
Carroll wrote for Saturday Night Live in the mid-1980s.  She was nominated for an Emmy for Outstanding Writing in a Variety or Music Program in 1987.

From 1994 through 1996, Carroll was the host and producer of the Ask E. Jean television series that aired on NBC's America's Talking—the predecessor to MSNBC. Entertainment Weekly called Carroll "the most entertaining cable talk show host you will never see." Carroll and the show were nominated for a CableACE Award in 1995.

Magazines, books, and anthologies
In addition to writing for magazines including The Atlantic and Vanity Fair, Carroll served as a contributing editor for Outside, Esquire, New York, and Playboy. She was Playboy's first female contributing editor.

Carroll was known for her gonzo-style first-person narratives. She hiked into the Star Mountains with an Atbalmin tracker and a Telefomin warrior; chronicled the lives of basketball groupies in a story called "Love in the Time of Magic"; and went to Indiana to investigate why four white farm kids were thrown out of school for dressing like black artists in "The Return of the White Negro". She tracked down her old boyfriends and moved in with them and their wives and went on a camping trip with Fran Lebowitz. Bill Tonelli, her Esquire and Rolling Stone editor, said in a 1999 interview that all of Carroll's stories were "pretty much the same thing. Which is: 'What is this person like when he or she is in a room with E. Jean?' She's institutionally incapable of being uninteresting."

Several of Carroll's pieces have been included in non-fiction anthologies such as The Best of Outside: The First 20 Years (Vintage Books, 1998), Out of the Noosphere: Adventure, Sports, Travel, and the Environment (Fireside, 1998) and Sand in My Bra: Funny Women Write from the Road (Traveler's Tales, 2003). Her 2002 story for Spin, "The Cheerleaders" was selected as one of the year's "Best True Crime Reporting" pieces. It appeared in Best American Crime Writing, edited by Otto Penzler, Thomas H. Cook, and Nicholas Pileggi (Pantheon Books, 2002).

In 1993, Carroll's biography of Hunter S. Thompson, Hunter: The Strange and Savage Life of Hunter S. Thompson, was published by Dutton. Her memoir, What Do We Need Men For?: A Modest Proposal was released in June 2019. The title refers to the 1729 satire A Modest Proposal by Jonathan Swift. In 2019, The New York Times referred to Carroll as "feminism's answer to Hunter S. Thompson."

In 2020 and 2021, Carroll published a series in The Atlantic, profiling several of the 25 women that have accused Trump of sexual misconduct including Natasha Stoynoff, Karena Virginia, Jessica Leeds, Alva Johnson and Kristin Anderson. Vanity Fair published Carroll's profile of Jill Harth. This American Life featured her in conversation with Jessica Leeds.

Online
In 2002, Carroll co-founded greatboyfriends.com with her sister, Cande Carroll. On the site, women recommended their ex-boyfriends to each other. GreatBoyfriends was acquired by The Knot Inc. in 2005. In 2004, she launched Catch27.com, a spoof of Facebook. On the site, people put their profiles on trading cards and bought, sold, and traded each other.  She launched an online version of her column, askejean.com, in 2007. Ten years later Carroll co-founded Tawkify, "a personal concierge" for dating." She also advised Tawkify's matchmaking team.

Sexual assault allegations

Les Moonves

Carroll was one of 13 women who accused CBS Corporation executive Les Moonves of sexual assault in 2019. She says the incident occurred in the late 1990s in a hotel elevator after interviewing Moonves for a story; he denied the allegation.

Donald Trump

On June 21, 2019, prior to the release of her book What Do We Need Men For?: A Modest Proposal, Carroll wrote in New York magazine that Donald Trump had sexually assaulted her in late 1995 or early 1996 in the Bergdorf Goodman department store in New York City. Her book contains details of the alleged incident. Carroll said that on her way out of the store she ran into Trump and he asked for help buying a gift for a woman. After suggesting a handbag or a hat, the two reputedly moved on to the lingerie section and joked about the other trying some on. Carroll said they ended up a dressing room together, the door of which was shut, and Trump forcefully kissed her, pulled down her tights and raped her before she was able to escape. She stated that the alleged incident lasted less than three minutes. Lisa Birnbach and Carol Martin told New York magazine that Carroll had confided with them after the alleged assault.

Trump denied the allegations and also claimed that he had never met her, although Carroll provided New York a photograph of her socializing with Trump in 1987. Trump dismissed the photograph's significance.

Carroll initially chose not to describe the alleged sexual assault as rape, instead describing it as a fight. "My word is fight. My word is not the victim word... I fought."

Defamation lawsuit
In November 2019, Carroll filed a defamation lawsuit with the New York Supreme Court. The suit states that Trump had damaged her reputation, substantially harmed her professionally, and caused emotional pain. Carroll stated "Decades ago, the now President of the United States raped me. When I had the courage to speak out about the attack, he defamed my character, accused me of lying for personal gain, even insulted my appearance." She stated that she was "filing this (lawsuit) on behalf of every woman who has ever been harassed, assaulted, silenced, or spoken up only to be shamed, fired, ridiculed and belittled." White House press secretary Stephanie Grisham described the suit as "frivolous" and claimed Carroll's story was fraudulent.

In September 2020, government lawyers from the Department of Justice (DOJ) asserted that Trump had acted in his official capacity while responding to Carroll's accusation; they asserted that the Federal Tort Claims Act grants their department the right to take the case from Trump's private lawyers and move it to federal court. This would end the lawsuit, as the government cannot be sued for defamation. Carroll's lawyer, Roberta A. Kaplan, stated that "Trump's effort to wield the power of the U.S. government to evade responsibility for his private misconduct is without precedent." In October 2020, U.S. District Court Judge Lewis Kaplan (not related) rejected the DOJ's motion, arguing that the president is not a government employee and that Trump's comments were not related to his job as such. The following month, the DOJ filed an appeal with the Second Circuit Court of Appeals.

In June 2021 (during the Biden administration), the DOJ argued to the Second Circuit appeals court that DOJ lawyers should defend Trump as a federal employee. On September 27, 2022, the appeals court ruled that "we cannot say what the District would do" in terms of allowing Trump to be shielded by his former office as U.S. president. On October 19, Trump was deposed as a witness in the case. In January 2023, the District of Columbia (D.C.) appeals court held oral arguments before a full panel of judges. Trump's lawyers argued that his comments fell within the scope of his employment, while some judges pointed out that D.C. law holds employers responsible when their employees cause individuals harm in the scope of their employment but not otherwise.

On November 24 2022, Carroll sued Trump for battery in New York under the Adult Survivors Act, a law passed the previous May which briefly allows sexual assault victims to file civil suits regardless of expired statutes of limitations. Carroll made a renewed claim of defamation, citing statements Trump made in October. In February 2023, Kaplan scheduled the trial date for April 25. The New York Daily News reported that Trump and Carroll were expected to be called as witnesses.

Personal life
Carroll resides around Warwick, New York. Prior to becoming a journalist in New York, Carroll lived in Montana with her first husband Steve Byers. Her second marriage was to John Johnson, an anchorman and artist. Caroll and Johnson divorced in 1990.

Selected books 
 1985: Female Difficulties: Sorority Sisters, Rodeo Queens, Frigid Women, Smut Stars, and Other Modern Girls, Bantam Books, 
 1993: Hunter: The Strange and Savage Life of Hunter S. Thompson, Dutton, 
 1997: A Dog in Heat Is a Hot Dog and Other Rules to Live By, a collection of her Ask E. Jean columns, Simon and Schuster, 
 2004: Mr. Right, Right Now, HarperCollins, 
 2019: What Do We Need Men For?: A Modest Proposal, St. Martin's Press,

References
Footnotes

Citations

External links
 
 
 

20th-century American women writers
21st-century American women writers
American advice columnists
American women columnists
Donald Trump controversies
Elle (magazine) writers
Living people
Writers from Detroit
Writers from Fort Wayne, Indiana
Indiana University alumni
Year of birth missing (living people)